The 2011–12 season was the Manitoba Junior Hockey League's (MJHL) 95th season of operation.

Season highlights
The Winnipeg Saints relocate to the St. James Civic Centre in Winnipeg.  This is the final season for the Saints, who permanently relocate to Virden after season's end.
The Portage Terriers switch to the Addison division.
The Terriers defeat the Saints in the final to win their second consecutive Turnbull Cup.  The Saints are the first (and only) team in MJHL history to win a playoff round as a crossover team. 
The Neepawa Natives are involved in a hazing scandal after a 15-year-old player comes forward with allegations of sexual-based rookie hazing in the team's locker room.  A $5,000 fine and 18 player suspensions are handed down by the league following an investigation.  Neepawa's head coach/general manager and assistant coach are later handed indefinite suspensions.  The club gains further negative publicity when they refuse to release or trade the player who brought the issue to light.

Standings

Playoffs

Post MJHL playoffs
Anavet Cup
Portage Terriers defeated by Humboldt Broncos 4-games-to-3.  Terriers advance to Royal Bank Cup as Humboldt is the host team.
Royal Bank Cup
Terriers finish fifth and eliminated from playoffs.

League awards
 Steve "Boomer" Hawrysh Award (MVP): Jayson Argue, Swan Valley
 MJHL Top Goaltender Award: Jayson Argue, Swan Valley
 Brian Kozak Award (Top Defenceman): Brendan Kotyk, Dauphin
 Vince Leah Trophy (Rookie of the Year): Tanner Jago, Winkler
 Lorne Lyndon Memorial Trophy (Hockey Ability and Sportsmanship): Derek Gingera, Wpg Blues
 Muzz McPherson Award (Coach of the Year): Don MacGillivray, Wpg Blues
 Mike Ridley Trophy (Scoring Champion): Jesse Sinatynski, Dauphin
 MJHL Playoff MVP: Kajon McKay, Portage
 CJAHL Player of the Year (MJHL): Jayson Argue, Swan Valley

References

External links
 MJHL Website
 2011-12 MJHL season at HockeyDB.com

Manitoba Junior Hockey League seasons
MJHL